Volcano boarding or volcano surfing is a sport performed on the slopes of a volcano. One of the most popular places for the activity is the Cerro Negro near Leon in western Nicaragua. Riders hike up the volcano and slide down, sitting or standing, on a thin plywood or metal board. The sport is also practiced on Mount Yasur on Tanna, Vanuatu, Mount Bromo in Indonesia, and very few other locations.

Volcano boarding can be an extreme sport. Potential dangers include falling and getting cut by the rough volcanic ash, breathing poisonous gasses, contracting histoplasmosis (otherwise known as "caver's disease"), or being hit by flying molten lava. Protective gear, including jumpsuits and goggles, is often used. Cerro Negro is also an active volcano, although the last eruption was in 1999. Mount Yasur is far more active and more dangerous, with volcanic eruptions occurring every day.

Sandboarding, a similar activity performed on sand dunes, was established in the 1970s and 1980s: Derek Bredenkamp and others boarded Swakopmund in Namibia around 1974; Jack Smith and Gary Fluitt popularized it in California in the early 1980s.

National Geographic Channel adventurer and journalist Zoltan Istvan credits himself with inventing the volcano boarding sport on Mount Yasur on the island of Tanna in Vanuatu in 2002, though Istvan first visited the active volcano in 1995. He filmed his adventure, and it later aired on the National Geographic Channel in a five-minute news segment. Istvan differentiates volcano boarding into two forms: 1) boarding down an active volcano where immediate dangers come from flying molten lava and lethal volcanic gases, and 2) boarding down an inactive volcano where no immediate danger is present (similar to sandboarding).

In Hawaii, an ancient sport known as he'e holua or lava sledding is a similar activity.

References

See also
Sandboarding
Snowboarding
Extreme sports
X Games

Boardsports
Volcanoes
Games and sports introduced in 2003